The Conference USA baseball tournament is the conference championship tournament in baseball for Conference USA (C-USA).  The winner of the tournament receives an automatic bid to the NCAA Division I baseball tournament.  The tournament format, which has changed several times, currently consists of an eight-team double-elimination tournament format, in which the winners of two four-team brackets play in a single-game final.  Rice, which has won the tournament seven times, is the most successful team in the tournament's history.

History
The tournament was first held in 1996, the first season after Conference USA was formed from the merger of the Metro Conference and the Great Midwest Conference.

1996–1999

From 1996 to 1999, the tournament format consisted of an eight-team double-elimination tournament preceded by a single-game play-in round.  The play-in round determined which of the lowest seeds (by regular season conference record) would qualify for the eight-team bracket.  In 1996, when the league had nine baseball-sponsoring schools, the play-in round included the 8th and 9th seeds.  When Houston joined from the Southwest Conference prior to the 1997 season, the play-in round featured the 7th–10th seeds.  The eight-team double-elimination tournament consisted of two four-team double-elimination brackets, the winners of which met in a single-game final.

2000–2009

In the 2000 tournament, the play-in round was eliminated, and the top eight seeds qualified for the eight-team double-elimination tournament automatically.  The eight-team bracket followed the same format as it had from 1996 to 1999.

2010

In 2010, the tournament format was changed from double-elimination to round robin.  The top six regular season finishers qualified for the tournament field, which consisted of two three-team "pods."  Pod 1 included the 1st, 4th, and 5th seeds, and Pod 2 included the 2nd, 3rd, and 6th seeds.  Each team played three preliminary games, two against its podmates and one against a team from the opposite group.  The cross-group games matched up the seeds as follows: 1st vs. 6th, 2nd vs. 5th, and 3rd vs. 4th.  The winner of each round robin pod advanced to a single-game final.

2011–2013

In 2011, the round robin format was expanded to the top eight regular season finishers.  The tournament field consisted of two four-team pods.  Pod 1 included the 1st, 4th, 5th, and 8th seeds, and Pod 2 included the 2nd, 3rd, 6th, and 7th seeds.  Each team played three preliminary games, one against each member of its pod.  The winner of each pod advanced to a single game.

2014–Present
Beginning in 2014, the format returned to the eight team double-elimination format used from 1996 through 2009.

Champions

By school
End of the 2022 tournament, updated.

 Bold indicate school currently sponsors baseball in Conference USA.
 Italics indicate school no longer sponsors baseball in Conference USA.

References

External links
 Conference USA baseball